Shiksha is a Vedic concept based on the Sanskrit word, which means "instruction, lesson, learning, study of skill"

Shiksha may also refer to:

Shiksha (NGO), Indian educational organization
Shiksha (film), a 1970 film
Shiksha - TeleVehicle,  a Bengali language satellite channel

See also
, where the term refers to learning, study, etc.
Shiksa